Dare to Be Different may refer to:

 Dare to Be Different (album), a 1990 album by Tommy Emmanuel
 Dare to Be Different (organisation), a nonprofit organisation